Branco van den Boomen (born 21 July 1995) is a Dutch professional footballer who plays as a midfielder for  club Toulouse.

Club career

Ajax
Born in Eindhoven, Van den Boomen began his football career in the youth ranks of RKVVO in Oerle, before moving to nearby Willem II/RKC Waalwijk in 2004. He then joined the famed Ajax Youth Academy signing his first professional contract, a three-year deal with Ajax on 4 March 2011.

Van den Boomen began the 2013–14 season playing for Ajax A1, the under-19 team, playing in the Nike A-Juniors Eredivisie. He also competed in three matches in the UEFA Youth League while scoring once against AC Milan U19, which earned him a berth with the club's reserves squad Jong Ajax competing in the Eerste Divisie, the 2nd tier of professional football in the Netherlands. He made his debut for Jong Ajax on 11 November 2013 in a match against De Graafschap, coming on as a substitute  in the 63rd minute for Wang Chengkuai who also made his debut in the same match. The match ended in a 2–1 loss at home for Jong Ajax. Van den Boomen scored his first professional goal in an away match against SC Telstar, scoring in the 3rd minute of the 3–1 loss. In January 2014 it was announced that Van den Boomen had officially been promoted to the Jong Ajax squad, and would not return to the club's youth ranks.

FC Eindhoven
On 19 June 2014, it was announced that Van den Boomen had signed with FC Eindhoven as a free transfer, returning to his city of birth, signing a three-year contract with the club. He made his first appearance for his new club on 15 August 2014 in a 3–0 home win against FC Emmen.

Toulouse
On 7 August 2020, Van den Boomen left the Netherlands for the first time in his career and joined French club Toulouse, who had been relegated to Ligue 2 after finishing 20th during the 2019–20 Ligue 1 season. Toulouse agreed to a €350,000 transfer fee with De Graafschap. Van den Boomen became the second Dutch player to join Toulouse after Rob Rensenbrink.

In the 2020–21 season, Van den Boomen became one of the key players of the Toulouse midfield also composed of Stijn Spierings and Brecht Dejaegere, scoring five goals and making seven assists.

The 2021–22 season saw Van den Boomen massively improve his numbers, having scored 12 and assisted a league record 21.

Career statistics

Honours 
Toulouse
 Ligue 2: 2021–22

Individual
UNFP Ligue 2 Team of the Year: 2021–22

References

External links
 Netherlands stats at OnsOranje
 
 

1995 births
Living people
People from Veldhoven
Association football midfielders
Dutch footballers
Netherlands youth international footballers
Eredivisie players
Eerste Divisie players
Ligue 2 players
Ligue 1 players
Jong Ajax players
FC Eindhoven players
SC Heerenveen players
Willem II (football club) players
De Graafschap players
Toulouse FC players
Dutch expatriate footballers
Dutch expatriate sportspeople in France
Expatriate footballers in France
Footballers from North Brabant